National Route 462 is a national highway of Japan connecting Saku, Nagano and Isesaki, Gunma in Japan, with a total length of 114.6 km (71.21 mi).

Route description
A section of National Route 462 in the town of Kanna in Gunma Prefecture is a musical road.

References

National highways in Japan
Roads in Gunma Prefecture
Roads in Nagano Prefecture
Roads in Saitama Prefecture
Musical roads in Japan